Bassilla (died circa 220), was a dancer, actress and singer in Ancient Rome.

A memorial was made to her memory by her colleague, the actor-dancer Heracleides, at the Roman theatre of Aquileia.

She is described as a stage performer who acted both in speaking roles in theatre plays and pantomime performances, as a dancer, and as a choir singer. Her fame reached across many cities of the Empire. She was referred to as an archimima, which was the title of the leading lady in a Roman theatre, and praised as a "10th Muse". She was known particularly for a certain death scene.

A role she is believed to have performed was the famous comedy role of the plotting wife Charition.

References 

Ancient actresses
Ancient Roman actors
Ancient Roman theatre practitioners
3rd-century Roman women
Ancient Roman dancers
Ancient singers
3rd-century deaths